Austinicotesia is a genus of braconid wasps in the family Braconidae. There are at least two described species in Austinicotesia.

Species
These two species belong to the genus Austinicotesia:
 Austinicotesia indonesiensis Fernandez-Triana & Boudreault, 2018 (Indonesia)
 Austinicotesia papuanus Fernandez-Triana & Boudreault, 2018 (Papua New Guinea)

References

Microgastrinae